Christiaan Benjamin Nieuwenhuis, known as C.B. Nieuwenhuis, (4 July 1863 in Amsterdam – 20 April 1922 in Padang) was a photographer in the Dutch East Indies.

He was born in Amsterdam in 1863 and his original surname was Niewenhuis. He volunteered for the militia in Batavia, Java in December 1883 for a six-year stint as a member of the Royal Military Band. In December 1889, he extended his contract for one more year.

He left the army in December 1890. In Batavia, he seemed to have worked at the Koene & Co. photo-studio and later left to Padang on West-Sumatra where he founded his own photo studio in February 1891. He died in Padang in April 1922.

Gallery

References 

1863 births
1922 deaths
Photographers from Amsterdam
People of the Dutch East Indies
Photography in the Dutch East Indies
20th-century Dutch photographers